Larceny in Her Heart is a 1946 American crime film directed by Sam Newfield and written by Raymond L. Schrock. The film stars Hugh Beaumont, Cheryl Walker, Ralph Dunn, Paul Bryar, Charles C. Wilson, Douglas Fowley and Gordon Richards. The film was released on July 10, 1946, by Producers Releasing Corporation.

Plot

Cast          
Hugh Beaumont as Michael Shayne
Cheryl Walker as Phyllis Hamilton
Ralph Dunn as Sgt. Pete Rafferty
Paul Bryar as Tim Rourke
Charles C. Wilson as Chief Gentry 
Douglas Fowley as Doc Patterson
Gordon Richards as Burton Stallings
Charles Quigley as Arch Dubler
Julia McMillan as Lucille
Marie Hannon as Helen Stallings / Barbara Brett
Lee Bennett as Whit Marlowe
Henry Hall as Dr. Porter

References

External links
 

1946 films
1940s English-language films
American crime films
1946 crime films
Producers Releasing Corporation films
Films directed by Sam Newfield
American black-and-white films
1940s American films